"Better" is a 2007 single by British singer-songwriter, Tom Baxter, co-written with Sam Semple. It was released on 3 December 2007, reaching a peak of No. 10 in the Irish Singles Chart and No. 67 in the UK Singles Chart in 2008.

Track listing
"Better"
"Too Far Gone"
Love Is Not Enough

Chart positions

Boyzone cover

The first version of the song to chart was a cover by Boyzone, released in December 2008 as the second and final single from their second greatest hits compilation, Back Again... No Matter What. It became their final single released before the death of band member Stephen Gately in 2009.

Background
Boyzone's version of the song features both Ronan Keating and Stephen Gately on lead vocals. The single received less promotion than Love You Anyway, due to the band's tour commitments, and charted much lower, selling 30,000 copies and becoming Boyzone's first single to miss the top 3 in Ireland and the first to miss the top 5 in the UK.

Music video
The music video for "Better" premiered on 14 October 2008. The entire video was shot in black and white, with each member of the group singing to a woman he is holding – with the exception of Stephen Gately, who is shown singing to a man – the only time a Boyzone video has depicted a same-sex love interest. The video marks the last appearance for Gately in a Boyzone video, due to his death in October 2009.

Track listing
 Digital download
 "Better" – 3:36
 "Coming Home Now" – 3:46

Chart positions

References

2008 singles
2007 songs
Boyzone songs
Polydor Records singles
Pop ballads
LGBT-related songs
Song recordings produced by Stephen Lipson